Kulegh Kashi (also Romanized as Kūlegh Kāshī; also known as Kūlaq Kāshī and Kūleh Kāshī) is a village in Band-e Zarak Rural District, in the Central District of Minab County, Hormozgan Province, Iran. At the 2006 census, its population was 2,059, in 364 families.

References 

Populated places in Minab County